German submarine U-482 was a Type VIIC U-boat of Nazi Germany's Kriegsmarine during World War II. She was laid down on 13 February 1942 at Deutsche Werke in Kiel as yard number 317 and went into service on 1 December 1943 under the command of  Hartmut Graf von Matuschka, Freiherr von Toppolczan und Spaetgen.

U-482 began her service by training with the 5th U-boat Flotilla. She then transferred to the 9th, followed by the 11th flotillas.

Design
German Type VIIC submarines were preceded by the shorter Type VIIB submarines. U-482 had a displacement of  when at the surface and  while submerged. She had two shafts and two  propellers.

U-482 was fitted with five  torpedo tubes (four fitted at the bow and one at the stern), fourteen torpedoes, one  SK C/35 naval gun, (220 rounds), one  Flak M42 and two twin  C/30 anti-aircraft guns. The boat had a complement of between forty-four and sixty.

Service history
U-482 carried out two war patrols from Bergen in Norway, having sailed briefly to Horten Naval Base (also in Norway), both under Matuschka's command. The first, which began on 14 August 1944, took U-482 off the coast of Ireland. It was the single most successful war patrol by a Type VII U-boat in 1944.

U-482 mounted a second patrol beginning 18 November, but was sunk with all hands a week later by the British frigate

Fate
During the war it was thought that the U-482 was not sunk until 16 January 1945, and that she had damaged the escort carrier  (later determined to be the work of ). Credit for her sinking was given to the ships of British Support Group 22. In the 1990s the British Admiralty revised that assessment and declared that U-482 had possibly struck a mine in the North Channel, off Malin Head, in early December 1944.

Summary of raiding history

Between August and November 1944 U-482 sailed on two combat patrols, sinking four merchant ships totalling  and 1,010 tons  .

References

Notes

Citations

Bibliography

 John Petersen: Darkest Before Dawn: U-482 and the Sinking of Empire Heritage 1944. The History Press, 2011.

External links

German Type VIIC submarines
U-boats commissioned in 1943
U-boats sunk in 1944
World War II submarines of Germany
1943 ships
Ships built in Kiel
World War II shipwrecks in the Irish Sea
Ships lost with all hands
U-boats sunk by British warships
Maritime incidents in November 1944